Babjak is a Slovak surname. Notable people with the surname include:

Ján Babjak
Jim Babjak (born 1957), American guitarist and banker
Štefan Babjak (1931–2008), Slovak tenor, father of Martin
Martin Babjak (born 1960), Slovak tenor
 

Slovak-language surnames